Vietnam competed at the 2016 Summer Olympics in Rio de Janeiro, Brazil, from 5 to 21 August 2016. It was the nation's ninth appearance at the Olympics, with the exception of the 1984 Summer Olympics in Los Angeles, because of the Soviet boycott.

The Vietnam Olympic Committee (VOC) fielded a squad of 23 athletes, 9 men and 14 women, to compete in 10 sports at the Games. It was the nation's largest delegation sent to the Olympics in a non-boycotting edition, and the second-largest overall in history, beating the record of 18 athletes who attended the London Games in 2012. This was also the youngest delegation in Vietnam's Olympic history, with about half under the age of 25. For the second time in history, the Vietnamese team featured more female athletes than males.

Eight athletes on the Vietnamese roster previously competed in London, with the rest of the field making their Olympic debut in Rio de Janeiro. Among the nation's athletes were pistol shooter and London 2012 fourth-place finalist Hoàng Xuân Vinh, world-ranked swimmer and 2014 Youth Olympic champion Nguyễn Thị Ánh Viên, weightlifter Trần Lê Quốc Toàn, and sabre fencer and two-time Southeast Asian Games titleholder Vũ Thành An, who was selected by the committee to carry the Vietnamese flag at the opening ceremony.

Vietnam left Rio de Janeiro with two medals, signifying its most successful Olympic showing at a single edition and also achieving the medal target set by VOC. Hoàng Xuân Vinh claimed his nation's first ever gold medal in the men's 10 m air pistol on the opening day of the Games, and then followed it up with a silver in the 50 m pistol four days later, emerging himself as the most decorated Vietnamese athlete in history.

Medalist

Background
Vietnam had participated in nine Summer Olympics between its debut in the 1980 Summer Olympics in Moscow, USSR, and the 2016 Summer Olympics in Rio de Janeiro, Brazil. Vietnam won two silver medals in the 2000 Sydney Olympics and the Beijing 2008 in taekwondo and weightlifting, respectively. The nation won its first bronze medal in London 2012 in weightlifting.

Athletics

In athletics, Vietnam was represented by Nguyễn Thành Ngưng and Nguyễn Thị Huyền. Ngưng was chosen based on his record-breaking result at the Asian Race Walking Championships in March 2016, while Huyền's winning performance in June 2015 at the Southeast Asian Games met the criteria for both the 2015 World Championships and 2016 Summer Olympics. Ngưng and Huyền both made their Olympic debuts and were the only qualified athletes from Southeast Asia by the International Association of Athletics Federations. Ngưng participated on 12 August in the Men's 20 km walk event, finishing 60th out of 63rd competitors on a route along Pontal and failing to advance to the quarterfinals. The following day, Huyền took part in the Women's 400 m event at the Estádio Olímpico Nilton Santos, where she finished in sixth with 52.97 seconds. On 15 August, she ran her heats in 57.87 seconds and finished at the penultimate position in the Women's 400 m hurdles event, only ahead of Natalya Asanova from Uzbekistan.

Badminton

Vietnam had two qualified badminton players, Nguyễn Tiến Minh and Vũ Thị Trang, for the following events in the Olympic tournament. They were selected among the top 34 individual shuttlers each in the men's and women's singles based on the Badminton World Federation World Rankings as of 5 May 2016. Their ranks were boosted by the performances in March at the 2016 New Zealand Open Grand Prix Gold, where Minh ended up at the semifinals. The 2016 Summer Games marked Trang's first and Minh's third time competing, making Minh the first-ever sportsman to represent Vietnam in three consecutive Olympics. In an interview before the Games, Minh said: "It is my third time so the happiness is multiplied three times... I am confident that my technique has improved a lot." Minh was responsible for directing and supporting Trang's matches, as the badminton players went to Rio de Janeiro without any coaches.

Trang first competed on 12 August, when she played against Nozomi Okuhara of Japan in the Women's singles event. She ultimately lost to Okuhara after the two-game match, with the score of 2–0 (10–21, 8–21). She went on to win over Lindaweni Fanetri of Indonesia two days later, with the score of 2–0 (21–12, 21–11). Despite finishing in second in the Group J and failing to advance to the Round of 16, Trang still fulfilled her personal goal of getting a winning match. Minh competed in the Group E in the Men's singles events, starting with the three-game match against Russia's Vladimir Malkov on 11 August. Minh won the match with the score of 2–1 (15–21, 21–9, 21–13). He scored his second win in the match against Austria's David Obernosterer the following day, with the result of 2-0 (21–18, 21–14). In the final group match on 14 August, Minh played against Lin Dan of China, who had won six previous contests with Minh. Lin ultimately won the match with the score of 2–0 (7–21, 12–21). Despite considering the 2016 Summer Games as his final time at the Olympics, Minh was still chosen to compete in 2021.

Fencing

Vietnam entered four fencers into the Olympic competition. Vũ Thành An, Nguyễn Thị Như Hoa, and Nguyễn Thị Lệ Dung had claimed their Olympic spots with the winning performances at the Asia and Oceania Zonal Qualifier, which took place in Wuxi in April 2016. In the Women's foil category, Đỗ Thị Anh lost the final match to New Zealand's Yuan Ping, who was later ruled ineligible to compete because she played under the Chinese jersey. Thị Anh was subsequently selected to replace Ping, as the next highest-ranked fencer, for the Games by the International Fencing Federation in June. 

Hoa was the first member to compete in the Women's épée event on 6 August, where she lost the match to Auriane Mallo of France with the score of 7–15 and finished last on the final ranking. Hoa was unsatisfied with the result, citing that she didn't have enough time to warm up prior to the match. Two days later, Dung was also lost at her only match against Kim Ji-yeon of South Korea on the Women's sabre event, with the score of 3–15. Thị Anh competed in the Women's foil events on 10 August, starting with the winning match against Aikaterini Kontochristopoulou from Greece with the score of 15–13. It was the first winning match for a Vietnamese fencer at the Olympics. Thị Anh lost her second match to Italy's Arianna Errigo with a score of 9–15, finishing 32nd out of 35th competitors on the final ranking. That same day, Thành An also took part in the Men's sabre events, where he won his first match against the 2012 Olympic silver medallist Diego Occhiuzzi of Italy with a score of 15–12. He lost in his final match with Vincent Anstett from France, with a score of 8–15, and ended up at the 15th position on the final ranking.

Gymnastics (artistic)

Vietnam entered two artistic gymnasts into the Olympic competition, Phạm Phước Hưng and Phan Thị Hà Thanh. The gymnasts qualified based on the results of each in the men's and women's apparatus and all-around events, respectively, at the Olympic Test Event in Rio de Janeiro in April 2016. Hưng and Thanh had previously attended at the 2012 Summer Olympics. Prior to the 2016 Olympics, Hưng experienced a recurrent back and neck pain from an injury, while Thanh had also not recovered from her knee injury. "I feel a little worried... But we are still very determined... We have high hopes for ourselves," Hưng said. Due to the injury, Hưng announced that he would not competing on the men's rings, a competition Hưng was well-trained, and solely focus on the men's parallel bars event instead. On 6 August, he took part in the men's artistic qualification where he gained a total score of 14.966, sharing the same score as Brinn Bevan of Great Britain. Hưng finished 17th out of 43rd competitors and failed to advance to the final round. The following day, Thanh competed in the women's artistic qualification, where she scored 14.233 points in vault and 13.800 points in balance beam, failing to make into the top eight competitors.

Judo

Văn Ngọc Tú was the only qualified judoka for Vietnam at the 2016 Games. She competed at the Olympics for the second consecutive time, the most for any Vietnamese judoka. She claimed her spot by being one of the highest-ranked judokas outside of the direct qualifying position in the International Judo Federation World Ranking List, which was announced on 30 May 2016. Despite having unsuccessfully qualifying competitions in the recent months, Tú still had stable cumulative points that helped her stay in the top 50 ranking. Because the designated team was limited, Tú went to the 2016 Games without her coach or expert and practiced by herself.

On 6 August, she competed against Valentina Moscatt of Australia in the women's extra-lightweight category –48 kg. In the four-minute match, neither of the judokas could score a point. Tú, who has fewer penalty points (shido) than Moscatt, was then announced as the winner by the referee. It was the first time a Vietnamese judoka has won a match at the Olympics. That same day, Tú was eliminated from the quarterfinal after losing in the match against South Korea's Jeong Bo-kyeong, who scored 102 points. After the Games, Tú earned a prize and a certificate by the Ministry of National Defense for her result as a military athlete. At the ceremony, she announced that it was her last time competing at the Olympics, saying "It was the most significant milestone of my career. An Olympic victory in Rio de Janeiro is what I wish for the most and it came true."

Rowing

After the Asia and Oceania Continental Qualification Regatta in Chungju in April 2016, Vietnam has three qualified rowers in two categories for the 2016 Games: Phạm Thị Huệ in the women's single sculls category; Phạm Thị Thảo and Tạ Thanh Huyền in the women's lightweight double sculls. However, because each country can only pick a maximum of one category, only Thảo and Huyền were chosen to represent Vietnam at the 2016 Olympics. Less than a month before the 2016 Games, Thảo abruptly withdrew from the team due to her suffering from a vertebrae injury. Huyền ended up teaming with Hồ Thị Lý in the women's lightweight double sculls events at the Rodrigo de Freitas Lagoon, starting with the 2000 m rowing regatta on 8 August. Huyền and Lý finished in the last place of the group, with a time of 7:29.91, despite being in the second place when they hit the first 500 m. The following day, the two went on to compete in the second group of competitors in the repechage, where they finished in fourth place with a time of 8:19.79, claiming their spots in the Semifinals C/D. In the semifinals on 11 August, they played in the first group of four and finished in third, only ahead of Yislena Hernández and Licet Hernández of Cuba, with a time of 8:18.47. The next day, Huyền and Lý were eligible for the finals in the Group C, competing for a spot between the 13th and 18th. The duo, however, chose to skip the competition after Huyền got a fever, finishing in 18th place on the final ranking.

Shooting

 
Vietnam had two qualified shooters for the 2016 Summer Olympics, Hoàng Xuân Vinh and Trần Quốc Cường. At the 2014 ISSF World Shooting Championships in September 2014, Vinh achieved the quota place for the 2016 Olympics at the men's 50m pistol, while Cường claimed his spot in the men's 10 m air pistol. It was Cường's first and Vinh's second consecutive time at the Olympics. Because of their early Olympics notices, the two shooters had more time to practice and compete in the 2015 ISSF World Cup. The shooters were trained in their homeland, the US and South Korea prior to the Games, before moving to Olympic Shooting Centre once they arrived at Rio de Janeiro. In an interview before going to the Games, Cường said that he and Vinh would try "to get the best results" and expressed his goal to reach the finals.

Vinh and Cường competed in the men's 10 m air pistol events on 6 August, starting with the qualification round where each shooter fired 60 shots. Vinh scored 581 points and ranked in 4th place, claiming a spot into the finals. Cường scored 575 points and finished 26th out of 46 competitors. In the final round, Vinh earned an additional 10.7 points in his last bullet, beating the 10.1 points scored by Brazilian shooter Felipe Wu. Vinh won the gold medal with the final score of 202.5 points, just 0.4 points higher than the runner-up. Four days later, Vinh and Cường took part in the qualification round of the men's 50 metre pistol events. Vinh got 556 points and ranked in sixth, making him eligible for the finals, while Cường scored 542 points and ranked 31th out of 41 competitors. In the final round, Vinh and Jin Jong-oh of South Korea were the last remaining shooters. Vinh came in second place after scoring low in his last two shots, with the final score of 191.3 points, 2.4 points lower than Jin's.

By scoring 202.5 points in the final round of the men's 10 m air pistol, Vinh set a new Olympic record based on the International Shooting Sport Federation Rule changed on 1 January 2013. He became the first Vietnamese athlete to win a gold medal at the Summer Olympics, six decades since Vietnam's first participation in 1952. His silver medal in the men's 50 metre pistol not only made him the first Vietnamese athlete to earn multiple Olympic medals, but also helped Vietnam reach the medal target set by the VOC. In an interview after the Games, Vinh said: "I am very emotional. I would like to dedicate this historic gold medal to all Vietnamese fans who have been waiting for an Olympic victory for decades." In a congratulations letter to Vinh, Prime Minister Nguyễn Xuân Phúc wrote that his victory "brings honor to the country and pride for officials, coaches, athletes and Vietnamese fans." Vinh received a total cash prize of $100.000 (2.4 billion VND) for his results at the Olympics.

Swimming

Vietnam entered two swimmers into the Olympic competition. Nguyễn Thị Ánh Viên was the only Vietnamese swimmer listed on the qualified list compiled by the International Swimming Federation in July 2016. Viên qualified in four A standards, three of them were reached when she competed a year earlier at the Southeast Asian Games. Hoàng Quý Phước, who achieved two B standards, qualified for the Games through wildcard place in July 2016. The VOC picked and submitted Phước among the four Vietnamese male swimmers who also reached the B standards for the sole wildcard spot. Phước achieved the B-standards in April 2015 while practicing in Japan. It marked Phước's first and Viên's second consecutive time at the Olympics.

Phước competed in the men's 200 m freestyle on 7 August. He and Ahmed Mathlouthi of Greece both finished last in the second group with a time of 1:50.39, and later shared the 41st position in the final ranking. On 6 August, Viên first competed in the women's 400 m individual medley, a category that she was well-trained and set the goal to reach the finals. With the finish time of 4:36.85, Viên came in first in the third group and broke her own national record set at the 2015 World Aquatics Championships in the category. Viên's result, however, was not enough to get her into the top eight swimmers in the final round; she ranked in 9th in the final ranking and only 0.31 seconds lower than the 8th ranking swimmer, Emily Overholt of Canada. The following day, she finished last in second group in the women's 400 metre freestyle event. With the finish time of 4:16.32, she ranked 26th out of 32 swimmers in the final ranking. Viên competed in the women's 200 m individual medley event on 8 August, where she finished at the penultimate position with the time of 2:16.20, only ahead of Uzbekistan's Ranohon Amanova, and ranked 33th out of 39 competitors in the final ranking.

Weightlifting

Vietnamese weightlifters qualified three men's quota places for the Rio Olympics based on their combined team standing by points at the 2014 and 2015 IWF World Championships. Thạch Kim Tuấn and Trần Lê Quốc Toàn were announced for the first two places, following by Hoàng Tấn Tài in May 2016. That month, Vương Thị Huyền was also chosen for a single women's Olympic spot, added by virtue of a top six national finish at the 2016 Asian Championships. Toàn was the only wrestler out of four who had previously competed at the 2012 Olympics. Huyền was the first wrestler to compete in the women's 48 kg division on 6 August. After her snatch attempt to lift 83kg was dismissed by the referees, Huyền spent the next two takes unsuccessfully trying to lift 84kg. The following day, Tuấn and Toàn went on to compete in the men's 56 kg division. Tuấn, who had suffered from a recurrent knee injury shortly before the Games, registered for 130 kg and managed to do it on the second try, ranked in fourth in the snatch round. In the clean and jerk round, Tuan raised the weight to 160 kg in the last two jerks but could not finish it. Toàn fared better when he successfully lifted 121 kg in snatch and 154 kg in clean and jerk, finishing 5th out of 15 wrestlers. Tài was the last wrestler to compete on the men's 85 kg event on 12 August. He managed to lift 145 kg in snatch and 180 kg in clean and jerk, finishing 16th out of 20 wrestlers.

Wrestling

Vietnam qualified two wrestlers, Vũ Thị Hằng and Nguyễn Thị Lụa, for each of the following weight classes into the Olympic competition. Hằng and Lụa were chosen as a result of their semifinal triumphs in March 2016 at the Asian Qualification Tournament. Lụa was the first Vietnamese wrestler to compete at the Olympics for the second consecutive time. A day before Hằng's opening match in the women's freestyle 48 kg event on 17 August, the delegation's medical department confirmed she had a recurrence of spinal and lumbar injuries. Hằng subsequently withdrew from the event. On 18 August, Lụa competed against Isabelle Sambou of Senegal in the women's freestyle 53 kg. Lụa lost the two-set match when Senegal knocked her to the floor, with a score of 0–5. Lụa finished 15th on the final ranking.

See also
 List of 2016 Summer Olympics medal winners
 List of Olympic records in shooting
 Vietnam at the 2016 Summer Paralympics

References

External links 

 

Olympics
Nations at the 2016 Summer Olympics
2016